The East District School is a historic school building at 365 Washington Street in Norwich, Connecticut.  Built in 1798, it is significant as a rare and well-preserved 18th-century schoolhouse, and as the location of an evening school for adults established by Consider Sterry, author of an early guide to practical navigation.  The school was listed on the National Register of Historic Places in 1970, and is a contributing property to the Norwichtown Historic District.

Description and history
The East District School is located in Norwich's geographically central Norwichtown, on the east side of Washington Street north of its junction with Butts Lane.  It is a small brick building, one story in height, with a gambrel roof covered in wooden shingles, oriented with a gable end facing the street.  That facade is two bays wide, with sash windows in each bay on both the first floor and attic level.  The building's fieldstone foundation is partially exposed on this side due to the sloping terrain.  The main facade faces south, and is three bays wide, with the entrance in the right bay and windows in the other two.

The building dates to no later than 1798, when Consider Sterry established an evening school for adults which met there.  Sterry, who was entirely self-taught, taught writing and bookkeeping, and instructed sailors in the methods of determining latitude and longitude at sea.  He also published treatises on a variety of subjects, as well as a 300-page book on navigation.  The school building, derelict at the time of its National Register listing in 1970, has been restored by the local historical society.

See also
National Register of Historic Places listings in New London County, Connecticut

References

School buildings on the National Register of Historic Places in Connecticut
School buildings completed in 1798
Buildings and structures in Norwich, Connecticut
National Register of Historic Places in New London County, Connecticut
Historic district contributing properties in Connecticut